CDL is the abbreviation of:

Chancellor of the Duchy of Lancaster, a senior appointment in the British cabinet
Chief of Defence Logistics, formerly a senior appointment in the British Armed Forces

Organizations
California Digital Library
Canadian Defence Lawyers
House of Freedoms (Casa delle Libertà; CdL), a former political alliance in Italy
China Democratic League, a social liberal political party in China
Chung Dahm Learning, is an English language institute in South Korea
Citadel Broadcasting Corporation stock ticker until early 2010
Citizens for Decency through Law, pro-censorship advocacy body
City Developments Limited, a Singapore-based international real estate development company
College du Leman, a Swiss boarding and day school

Technology
Canal Defence Light, a World War 2 British secret weapon
Character Description Language
Color Decision List
Common Data Link
Compiler Description Language, to develop computer compilers
Command Language Definition of DCL
Configuration Deviation List, see List of aviation, aerospace and aeronautical abbreviations
Controlled digital lending, a model of digital library

Other uses
Call of Duty League, a professional esports league for the video game series Call of Duty
Child-directed language, or baby talk
Commercial Driver's License, for commercial motor vehicles (trucks, buses etc.)
Container-deposit legislation, any law that requires the collection of a monetary deposit on beverage containers
450 in Roman numerals "CDL"